"Conmigo" is a song by French singer Kendji Girac from the album Kendji (2014). It peaked at number six and seven in Wallonia and France respectively.

Charts

Weekly charts

Year-end charts

References 

2015 singles
2015 songs
Kendji Girac songs
Songs written by Nazim Khaled